Silene fraudatrix is a species of flowering plant in the family Caryophyllaceae of restricted distribution known by the common name Alevkaya Sinekkapani. It is endemic to Northern Cyprus, where it is known only from Alevkaya where it is common to Tatlisu.

Description

Slender annual, often branched below with stems to 15 cm long, erect or spreading; flowers few, 1.5 cm across, single or paired in a very loose branched spray;  petals rose pink to whitish, notched at the tip and with 2-lobed coronal scales at the throat. More branched forms with white flowers are found later in the season. Flowers from Mars to May.

Habitat

On rocky mountain slopes under pine and cypress.

References

 Flora of Cyprus Volume 1, Robert Desmond Meikle, Bentham-Moxon Trust, The Herbarium Royal Botanic Gardens Kew, 1985, 

fraudatrix
Endemic flora of Cyprus